The Curtis School at 2349 E. Orchard Rd. in Greenwood Village, Colorado was built in 1914.  It was listed on the National Register of Historic Places in 1992.  It served as a school and as a meeting hall.

It is a one-story red brick schoolhouse with a central bell tower, and is the oldest public building in Greenwood Village.

References

External links

Schools in Colorado
National Register of Historic Places in Arapahoe County, Colorado
School buildings completed in 1914
School buildings on the National Register of Historic Places in Colorado
1914 establishments in Colorado